Alcyone (Ancient Greek Ἁλκυόνη Αlkuónē, derived from alkyon αλκυων "kingfisher"), in Greek mythology, was the name of one of the Pleiades, daughters of Atlas and Pleione or, more rarely, Aethra.  She attracted the attention of the god Poseidon and bore him several children, variously named in the sources: Hyrieus, Hyperenor, and Aethusa; Hyperes and Anthas; and Epopeus. By a mortal, Anthedon, Alcyone became the mother of the fisherman Glaucus, who was later transformed into a marine god. There are various etymological interpretations of her name's origin.

Notes

References
 Athenaeus of Naucratis. The Deipnosophists or Banquet of the Learned. London. Henry G. Bohn, York Street, Covent Garden. 1854.  Online version at the Perseus Digital Library.
 Athenaeus of Naucratis. Deipnosophistae. Kaibel. In Aedibus B.G. Teubneri. Lipsiae. 1887. Greek text available at the Perseus Digital Library.
 Hyginus, Fabulae from The Myths of Hyginus translated and edited by Mary Grant. University of Kansas Publications in Humanistic Studies. Online version at the Topos Text Project.
 M. Grant and J. Hazel, Who's Who in Greek Mythology, David McKay and Co Inc, 1979
 Pausanias, Description of Greece with an English Translation by W.H.S. Jones, Litt.D., and H.A. Ormerod, M.A., in 4 Volumes. Cambridge, MA, Harvard University Press; London, William Heinemann Ltd. 1918. Online version at the Perseus Digital Library
 Pausanias, Graeciae Descriptio. 3 vols. Leipzig, Teubner. 1903.  Greek text available at the Perseus Digital Library.
 Apollodorus, The Library with an English Translation by Sir James George Frazer, F.B.A., F.R.S. in 2 Volumes, Cambridge, MA, Harvard University Press; London, William Heinemann Ltd. 1921. Online version at the Perseus Digital Library. Greek text available from the same website.
 Publius Ovidius Naso, The Epistles of Ovid. London. J. Nunn, Great-Queen-Street; R. Priestly, 143, High-Holborn; R. Lea, Greek-Street, Soho; and J. Rodwell, New-Bond-Street. 1813. Online version at the Perseus Digital Library.

Pleiades (Greek mythology)
Nymphs
Women of Poseidon
Arcadian characters in Greek mythology
Arcadian mythology
Boeotian mythology